Australian singer Dannii Minogue has released five studio albums, eight compilation albums, twenty-eight singles, twenty-three music videos, and five video albums. Minogue rose to prominence in the early 1980s for her roles in the Australian television talent show Young Talent Time and in the soap opera Home and Away, before commencing her career as a pop singer in the early 1990s.

In Australia and the United Kingdom, Minogue achieved early success with singles such as "Love and Kisses" and "Success". Her debut studio album, Love and Kisses, was released in the UK in June 1991 and October 1990 in Australia. The album peaked at number eight on the UK Albums Chart and was certified gold by the British Phonographic Industry (BPI). However, by the time of the release of her second studio album, Get into You (1993), her popularity as a singer had declined.

The late 1990s saw Minogue reinvent herself as a dance artist with "All I Wanna Do", her first number-one UK dance hit. In 2001, Minogue returned to further musical success with the release of "Who Do You Love Now?" (a collaboration with Riva), while her subsequent album, Neon Nights, reached number eight in the UK. The album produced three singles, including "I Begin to Wonder", which reached number two in the UK.

Since 2007, Minogue's musical career has mainly been on hiatus, only releasing the odd song intermittently due to her focusing on television presenting and her fashion label, Project D.

Albums

Studio albums

Compilation albums

Singles

As lead artist

 Minogue's singles were not released in the UK until 1991, with "I Don't Wanna Take This Pain" being released as the 5th single, not the 3rd (as it was in Australia).

Featured artist

Promotional singles

Other appearances

Videography

Video albums

Music videos

Notes

A  In Japan, the album was released as Party Jam. Love and Kisses was reissued in April 1992 as Love and Kisses and... with additional remixes. A deluxe edition was released in December 2009 with remixes and b-sides.
B  The album was reissued in December 2009 with additional remixes and previously unreleased material.
C  The album was reissued in November 2007 with additional remixes.
D  The album was reissued in October 2007 with additional remixes and previously unreleased material.

See also

References

External links
 

Discography
Discographies of Australian artists
Pop music discographies